Castel Menardo (Italian for Menardo Castle)  is a  medieval castle in Serramonacesca, Province of Pescara, Abruzzo, southern Italy.

References

External links

Menardo
Serramonacesca